Tonica terasella is a moth in the family Depressariidae. It was described by Francis Walker in 1864. It is found on Borneo.

Adults are testaceous cinereous, the forewings thinly and minutely speckled with brown. There are two minute brown streaks near the base and a few minute tufts of oblique scales.

References

Moths described in 1864
Tonica